Hari Parbat, also called Koh-i-Maran, is a hill overlooking Srinagar, the largest city and the capital of Jammu and Kashmir, India. It is the site of a fort, built by the Durrani Empire, and of a Hindu temple, mosques, and gurdwara.

The Indian government on 15 August 2021 (the 75th independence day) hoisted a 100 feet tall Indian flag on the top of the fort.

Durrani Fort 
The first fortifications on the site were constructed by the Mughal emperor Akbar in 1590 who built an outer wall for the fort as part of his plans for a new capital at the site of modern-day Srinagar city in Kashmir. The project, however, was never completed. The present fort was built in 1808 under the reign of the Governor of Kashmir Province of the Durrani Empire, Atta Mohammed Khan.

The fort can be reached via two sides of the city, (a) via Rainawari through Kathi Darwaza Gate and (b) via Hawal through the Sangin Darwaza Gate. The fort was closed for almost 2 decades and thrown open to the public in 2007.

Hindu temple 
Hari Parbat is considered sacred by some Kashmiri Pandits. According to  Brahmin Mythology, the area of Hari Parbat was occupied by Asura Jalobhava. The local Hindus prayed to Parvati (Shiva's consort) for help. She took the form of a bird and dropped a pebble on the Asura's head, which grew larger and larger until it crushed the demon. Hari Parbat is revered as that pebble, and Parvati is worshipped as Sharika (as cosmic energy pervading the universe) occupying the middle part of the western slope of the hill where there is a temple of Shakti, who is worshipped there under the name Jagadamba Sharika Bhagawati (or, simply, Sharika). She is depicted as having 18 arms and sitting in Shri Chakra.

Muslim shrines 
The southern side of Hari Parbat features Makhdoom Sahib, the shrine of Hamza Makhdoom, a 16th-century Kashmiri Sufi saint locally known as Hazrat Sultan and Sultan-ul-Arifeen.

Built below the fort is a mosque dedicated to Shah Badakhshi, a 17th-century Qadiri Sufi saint. The mosque was built by Mughal princess Jahanara Begum.

Gurdwaras 

Gurdwara Chatti Patshahi at Kathi Darwaza, Rainwari, is believed to be the place where Guru Har Gobind, the sixth Sikh guru, stayed for few days while travelling through Kashmir.

Gurdwara Guru Nanak Dev is a place where Guru Nanak sat and had discourse with people in early sixteenth century. It was earmarked with a pedestal by Mohammad Ata Khan, a general of Akbar who built the Durrani Fort. A small Gurdwara was later built at the place by Guru Har Gobind.

Gallery

See also 
Badamwari Park, situated at the foothills of Hari Parbat

References

External links 

 A Video Presentation on Hari Parbat Temple

Hills of India
Hills of Jammu and Kashmir
Hindu temples in India
Hindu temples in Jammu and Kashmir
Forts in India
Forts in Jammu and Kashmir
Tourist attractions in India
Tourist attractions in Srinagar
Buildings and structures in India
Buildings and structures in Srinagar